Adarsavanthudu is a 1984 Telugu-language drama film, produced by Ch. Prakash Rao under the Maheejaa Films banner and directed by Kodi Ramakrishna. It stars Akkineni Nageswara Rao and Radha, with music composed by S. Rajeswara Rao.

Plot
Sridhar (Akkineni Nageswara Rao) an advocate, son of a millionaire and retired Chief Justice Raja Shekaram (Jaggayya). Sridhar always enjoys the life in the frolic, after completing his studies he returns to his hometown. On the way, he gets acquaintance with a beautiful girl Lakshmi (Radha) who abuses his arrogance but he likes her attitude. After reaching home, Sridhar takes up his first case and proves an innocent girl as a prostitute. Due to which the girl commits suicide which suffers Sridhar out of contrition. At that moment, his driver Chiranjeevi (Ramakrishna) consoles and makes him understand the difference between justice & injustice. There onwards, Sridhar decides to stand for piety. Meanwhile, Sridhar's maternal uncle Dattudu (Gollapudi Maruthi Rao) who behaves like a dictator of a village and performs a lot of atrocities along with adjacent village head Lingaiah (Nutan Prasad) brings a false case where Sridhar supports the truth and punishes the accuses. Keeping this grudge in mind Dattudu tries to kill Sridhar when Chiranjeevi sacrifices his life to save him. Before dying, he entrusts his family responsibilities to Sridhar. In this issue, Sridhar has to differ with his father and leaves the house. After that, Sridhar reaches Chiranjeevi's village which is headed by Lingaiah, meets his parents Raghavaiah (Kanta Rao) & Janakamma (Anjali Devi) where he is surprised to see Lakshmi as their daughter. At Present, Sridhar merges with them, but Lakshmi has a doubt, so, she digs out the truth and blames him for the cause. On the other side, Lingaiah has a bad eye on Lakshmi and threatens Raghavaiah to make his marriage with her for his debt which leads to his death. Even Lingaiah enormities increase day by day who occupies entire fields of villagers and does not allow them to farm. Here Sridhar aids them when Lakshmi understands his virtue and both of them fall in love. Parallelly, Dattudu witnesses Sridhar and mistakes him as an identical person to him and makes a ploy with Lingaiah that to replace him as Sridhar to grab his property. Knowing their malice Sridhar agrees, plays a drama along with Lakshmi and sees their end. Finally, the movie ends on a happy note with the marriage of Sridhar & Lakshmi.

Cast
Akkineni Nageswara Rao as Sridhar 
Radha as Lakshmi 
Jaggayya as Justice Raja Shekharam 
Kanta Rao as Raghavaiah
Ramakrishna as Chiranjeevi
Gollapudi Maruthi Rao as Dattudu
Nutan Prasad as Lingaiah 
Anjali Devi as Janakamma
Athili Lakshmi as Annapurna 
Shyamala Gowri as Kavitha

Crew
Art: Bhaskar Raju
Choreography: Siva Subramanyam, Tarun
Lyrics — Dialogues: Acharya Aatreya
Playback: S. P. Balasubrahmanyam, P. Susheela, Madhavapeddi Ramesh
Music: S. Rajeswara Rao 
Editing: Veemuri Ravi 
Cinematography: S. Navakanth
Producer: Ch. Prakash Rao
Story — Screenplay — Director: Kodi Ramakrishna 
Banner: Maheejaa Films
Release Date: 30 July 1984

Soundtrack

Music composed by S. Rajeswara Rao. Lyrics were written by Acharya Aatreya.

References

External links

Indian drama films
Films scored by S. Rajeswara Rao
Films directed by Kodi Ramakrishna
1984 drama films
1984 films